John Joubert may refer to:

John Joubert (composer) (1927–2019), British composer
John Joubert (serial killer) (1963–1996), American serial killer